is a Ryukyuan gusuku in Yomitan, Okinawa. It is in ruins, but the walls and foundations have been restored. In 2000, Zakimi Castle was designated as a World Heritage Site, as a part of the Gusuku Sites and Related Properties of the Kingdom of Ryukyu.

History
It was built between 1416 and 1422 by the renowned Ryukyuan general Gosamaru, a project which involved workers from as far away as the Amami Islands, and was partly constructed with materials taken from nearby Yamada Castle. Zakimi Castle oversaw the northern portion of central Okinawa Island. The fortress has two inner courts, each with an arched gate. This is Okinawa's first stone arch gate featuring the unique keystone masonry of the Ryukyus.

Before and during World War II, the castle was used as a gun emplacement by the Japanese. After the war it was used as a radar station by the US forces. Some of the walls were destroyed to install the radar equipment, but they have been restored. Zakimi Castle and Okinawa's other castles were named World Heritage Sites by UNESCO in November 2000.

References

Buildings and structures completed in 1422
Houses completed in the 15th century
World Heritage Sites in Japan
Former castles in Japan
Castles in Okinawa Prefecture
Historic Sites of Japan